Venus Williams was the defending champion, but lost in quarterfinals to Amanda Coetzer.

Martina Hingis won the title by defeating Arantxa Sánchez Vicario 6–3, 6–3 in the final.

Seeds
The first four seeds received a bye into the second round.

Draw

Finals

Top half

Bottom half

References

External links
 Official results archive (ITF)
 Official results archive (WTA)

2000 WTA Tour